The radiocommunication division of the International Telecommunication Union uses the following letter codes to identify its member countries.  Eight countries are assigned single-letter codes, while the rest have codes three letters in length.

The ITU also designates the following codes for other areas around the world that are not member states.

Libya is not ITU name.
South Korea is not ITU name.

References

Weblinks 
 ITU: List of all geographical area designations

ITU
Letter Codes
Location codes